Marina Burakova   (born 8 May 1966) is a former Russian women's international footballer who played as a defender. She was a member of the Russia women's national football team. She was part of the team at the 1999 FIFA Women's World Cup and 2003 FIFA Women's World Cup where she was the team captain.

References

1966 births
Living people
Soviet women's footballers
Russian women's footballers
Russia women's international footballers
Sportspeople from Smolensk
1999 FIFA Women's World Cup players
2003 FIFA Women's World Cup players
Women's association football defenders
FIFA Century Club
FC Energy Voronezh players
Ryazan-VDV players
FC Lada Togliatti (women) players
Russian Women's Football Championship players